Anaparthy Assembly constituency is a constituency in East Godavari district of Andhra Pradesh, representing the state legislative assembly in India. It is one of the seven assembly segments of Rajahmundry Lok Sabha constituency, along with Rajanagaram, Rajahmundry City, Rajahmundry Rural, Kovvur, Nidadavole, and Gopalapuram. Dr. Sathi Suryanarayana Reddy is the present MLA of the constituency, who won the 2019 Andhra Pradesh Legislative Assembly election from Yuvajana Sramika Rythu Congress Party. In 2019, there were a total of 213,472 electors in the constituency.

Mandals 

The four mandals that form the assembly constituency are:

Members of Legislative Assembly

Election results

Assembly elections 1952

Assembly Elections 2004

Assembly Elections 2009

Assembly elections 2014

Assembly elections 2019

1952

See also 
 List of constituencies of the Andhra Pradesh Legislative Assembly

References 

Assembly constituencies of Andhra Pradesh